X-linked dystonia parkinsonism (XDP), also known as Lubag Syndrome or X-linked Dystonia of Panay, is a rare x-linked progressive movement disorder with high penetrance found almost exclusively in males from Panay, Philippines. It is characterized by dystonic movements first typically occurring in the 3rd and 4th decade of life. The dystonic movements often either coexist or develop into parkinsonism within 10 years of disease onset.

Symptoms and signs
Symptoms typically present in the 3rd or 4th decade of life, but have been seen as early as the age of 14. It presents with torsion dystonia, particularly when presenting at a younger age, which then progresses to parkinsonism with or without ongoing dystonia. Often the two symptoms coexist. The parkinsonian features of x-linked dystonia parkinsonism include festinating gait, bradykinesia, blepharospasm, and postural instability. It often lacks a resting tremor, helping to differentiate it from Parkinson's disease.

Genetics

X-linked dystonia parkinsonism is thought to result from a mutation of the TAF1 (TATA-binding protein-associated factor 1) gene at Xq13.1. It has an X-linked, recessive pattern of inheritance. Genetic analysis suggests that the responsible mutation was introduced into the ethnic groups of Panay (especially to the Hiligaynon people) over two millennia ago.

Diagnosis

Treatment
There is no cure for XDP and medical treatment offers only temporary relief. Some authors have reported benzodiazepines and anticholinergic agents in the early stages of the disease. Botulinum toxin injections have been used to relieve focal dystonia. Deep brain stimulation has shown promise in the few cases treated surgically.

Epidemiology
Although all early reported cases occurred in the Philippines, X-linked dystonia parkinsonism has been diagnosed in Japan, US, Canada, and Germany in people of Filipino descent. The prevalence in the Philippines has been estimated at 1/322,000 and as high as 1/4,000 in the province of Capiz's male population. As an x-linked recessive disease, the majority of those affected are males with females generally being asymptomatic carriers. In the largest described series, the mean age of onset was 39.7 years, the mean duration of illness was 16 years, and the mean age of death was 55.6 years.

History
The high concentration of XDP in the Philippines was first documented in the 1970s after the Philippine General Hospital received 5 neurology referrals labelled as "dystonia musculorum deformans". This sparked an epidemiological survey which was published in 1976. Lee et al. described a series of 28 men, 23 of whom were from Panay Island. She found six families that each had more than one male member affected with XDP and found that there was no male to male transmission. There was also a family history of parkinsonism in some of the patients.
The name Lubag is based on the term used by Ilongo speaking Filipinos. It describes any movements with torsion.

References

External links 

Extrapyramidal and movement disorders
Rare diseases
Dystonia
X-linked recessive disorders